Dawmont is an unincorporated community in Harrison County, West Virginia, United States. Former National Football League player and University of Pittsburgh football coach Foge Fazio was born in Dawmont.

The community's name is an amalgamation of Dawson Coleman and Rosemont, the former the proprietor of the Rosemont coal mine.

References

Unincorporated communities in Harrison County, West Virginia
Unincorporated communities in West Virginia